El Diablo, Spanish for "the Devil", is a nickname of the following:

Cristián Bejarano (born 1981), Mexican boxer
Claudio Chiappucci (born 1963), Italian former cyclist
Joël Despaigne (born 1966), Cuban retired volleyball player
Marco Etcheverry (born 1970), Bolivian retired footballer
José Antonio Fernández (born 1954), Mexican businessman
Angel Manfredy (born 1974), Puerto Rican former boxer
Luis Ernesto Michel (born 1979), Mexican football goalkeeper
Claudio Núñez (born 1975), Chilean retired footballer
Didi Senft (born 1952), German cyclist and inventor
Wells Thompson (born 1983), American soccer player
Willie Wells (1906-1989), American baseball player in the Negro leagues
Fabio Quartararo (1999-), French Motorcycle racer

See also 

 
 
 Frank Varey (1908-1988), English speedway rider nicknamed "El Diablo Rojo" ("The Red Devil")
 Krzysztof Włodarczyk (born 1981), Polish boxer nicknamed "Diablo"

Lists of people by nickname